WATH (970 AM) is a radio station broadcasting a classic hits format. Licensed to Athens, Ohio, United States.  The station is currently owned by WATH, Inc. and features programming from CBS News Radio, Fox Sports Radio and Westwood One.

History
970 WATH first hit the airwaves in Athens, Ohio, on October 25, 1950.

Notable on-air talent

Current

Dave Palmer
Skye Hope
River Chalker
Troy Bolin
Connor Mills 
Samantha Garcia
DJ Lizzard
Barry Bolin
Joey Madore

Former

Chuck Dailey 
Fred Palmer 
Jon Zellner
Lukas Moore
Ryan Boyd
Jake Hromada
Ted Covert
Tim Daugherty 
Doug Partusch
Matthew Harris
Rick Redding
Steve Mackall
Scott Dailey
Penny Purdy

Notable alumni
Fred Palmer - (National Association of Broadcasters Broadcasting Hall of Fame)
Thom Brennaman

References

External links

ATH
Classic hits radio stations in the United States
Talk radio stations in the United States
Radio stations established in 1950
1950 establishments in Ohio